Live at Montreux 2005 is a live album by Steve Earle. The album was recorded in July 2005 and released on July 11, 2006.

Track listing
All songs written by Steve Earle unless otherwise noted.
"Jerusalem" - 4:29
"What's a Simple Man to Do" - 3:32
"The Devil's Right Hand" - 2:45
"Warrior" - 3:22
"Rich Man's War" - 3:49
"South Nashville Blues" - 2:52
"CCKMP" - 4:14
"Dixieland" - 3:48
"Ellis Unit One" - 4:40
"Condi Condi" - 3:31
"The Mountain" - 5:12
"The Revolution Starts Now" - 4:02
"Copperhead Road" - 4:30
"Christmas in Washington" - 5:36

References

Steve Earle live albums
Albums recorded at the Montreux Jazz Festival
2006 live albums